The Book of Poruḷ, in full Poruṭpāl (Tamil: பொருட்பால், literally, "division of wealth or polity"), also known as the Book of Wealth, Book of Polity, the Second Book or Book Two in translated versions, is the second of the three books or parts of the Kural literature, authored by the ancient Indian philosopher Valluvar. Written in High Tamil distich form, it has 70 chapters each containing 10 kurals or couplets, making a total of 700 couplets all dealing with statecraft. Poruḷ, which means both 'wealth' and 'meaning', correlates with the second of the four ancient Indian values of dharma, artha, kama and moksha. The Book of Poruḷ deals with polity, or virtues of an individual with respect to the surroundings, including the stately qualities of administration, wisdom, prudence, nobility, diplomacy, citizenship, geniality, industry, chastity, sobriety and teetotalism, that is expected of every individual, keeping aṟam or dharma as the base.

Etymology and meanings
Poruḷ is the Tamil word that corresponds to the Sanskrit term 'artha', and pāl refers to 'division'. Similar to its cousins aṟam (dharma), inbam (kama), and veedu (moksha), poruḷ as a concept includes multiple meanings, rendering it almost impossible to capture its meaning in a single word in any non-Indian language. The term artha, however, is common to all Indian languages.

As one of the four mutually non-exclusive aims of human life in Indian philosophy called the Puruṣārtha, poruḷ literally translates as "meaning, sense, goal, purpose or essence" depending on the context. Poruḷ is also a broader concept in the scriptures of Hinduism. As a concept, it has multiple meanings, all implying "means of life", activities and resources that enable one to be in a state one wants to be in.

Poruḷ applies to both an individual and a government. In an individual's context, poruḷ includes wealth, career, activity to make a living, financial security and economic prosperity. At government level, poruḷ includes social, legal, economic and worldly affairs. Proper pursuit of it is considered an important and necessary objective of both the individual and the government.

John Lochtefeld describes artha as the means of life, and includes material prosperity. Karl Potter explains it as an attitude and capability that enables one to make a living, to remain alive, to thrive as a free person. It includes economic prosperity, security and health of oneself and those one feels responsible for. Artha includes everything in one's environment that allows one to live. It is neither an end state nor an endless goal of aimlessly amassing money, claims Karl Potter, rather it is an attitude and necessary requirement of human life. In a different viewpoint, John Koller suggests artha is not an attitude, rather it is one of the necessities of human life. A central premise of Hindu philosophy, claims Koller, is that every person should live a joyous and pleasurable life, that such fulfilling life requires every person's needs and desires be acknowledged and fulfilled, that needs can only be satisfied through activity and when sufficient means for those activities are available. Artha, then, is best described as pursuit of activities and means necessary for a joyous and pleasurable life. Daya Krishna views artha as a subset of kama and karma.

Vatsyayana in Kama Sutra defines artha as the acquisition of arts, land, cattle, wealth, equipages and friends. He explains, artha is also protection of what is already acquired, and the increase of what is protected. Gavin Flood explains artha as "worldly success" without violating dharma (moral responsibility), kama (love) and one's journey towards moksha (spiritual liberation). Flood clarifies that artha in ancient Hindu literature, as well as purushartha, is better understood as a goal of Man (not a man). In other words, it is one of the four purposes of human life. The survival and the thriving of humans requires artha—that is, economic activity, wealth and its creation, worldly success, profit, political success and all that is necessary for human existence.

Medieval commentators such as Pariperumal, Ilampooranar, and Nacchinarkkiniyar define porul as essential elements of a state. Pariperumal's definition to porul provides an overall synopsis to the chapters of the Book of Porul. According to S. N. Kandasamy, within the Kural literature the term poruḷ takes various meanings, including asset, meaning, possession, wealth, good result, virtue, quality, reality, deed, importance or essentiality, and good things. Kandasamy further states that despite all the vast variations in meaning, the term poruḷ primarily means the ultimate reality.

The book and its chapters
The Book of Poruḷ talks about the interpersonal skills of an individual that are essential to lead a meaningful life in the society. It covers both political and economic matters. With 70 chapters, the Book of Poruḷ is the largest of the three books of the Kural text. The chapters chiefly deal with polity and administration, including citizenship and social relations, in a manner similar to the Hindu text Arthasastra. According to Czech Indologist Kamil Zvelebil, Valluvar "undoubtedly" bases some of his teachings in the Book of Poruḷ on the then extant Sanskrit works such as the Arthashastra. The text insists on a royalty with ministers bound to a code of ethics and a system of justice rather than democracy. In the words of K. V. Nagarajan, the king, according to Valluvar, is assigned the "role of producing, acquiring, conserving, and dispensing wealth". The king's duty is to provide a just rule, be impartial and have courage in protecting his subjects and in meting out justice and punishment. Valluvar insists that an army has a duty to kill in battle, and a king must execute criminals for justice, but does so only after emphasizing non-killing as every individual's personal virtue in the Book of Aṟam. The book also cautions against tyranny, oppression and nepotism, with the suggestion that such royal behavior ultimately results in disasters, depletes the state's wealth and ultimately results in the loss of power and prosperity. The book, in a social and political context, recommends a death sentence for the wicked only as a means of justice. Valluvar presents his theory of state using six elements: army (patai), subjects (kuti), treasure (kul), ministers (amaiccu), allies (natpu), and forts (aran), recommending forts and other infrastructure, supplies and food storage in preparation for siege. A king and his army must always be ready for war, and should launch a violent offensive, at the right place and right time, when the situation so demands and particularly against corrupt kingdoms. A good and strong kingdom must be protected with forts made of thick, high and impenetrable walls. The text recommends a hierarchical military organization staffed with fearless soldiers who are willing to die in war.

As with Books I and III of the Kural text, the author did not group the chapters under any subdivisions. However, the ten medieval commentators, who were the first to write commentaries about the Tirukkural, divided the Book of Poruḷ variously between three and six portions. For example, while Parimelalhagar divides the book into three parts, namely, kingship (royalty), elements of sovereignty (angas or limbs of the state) and common duties, other medieval scholars have divided the Book of Poruḷ into five or even six portions.

Book Two—Wealth (பொருட்பால் Poruṭpāl)
 Chapter 39. The Greatness of a King (இறைமாட்சி iṟaimāṭci): 381–390
 Chapter 40. Learning (கல்வி kalvi): 391–400
 Chapter 41. Ignorance (கல்லாமை kallāmai): 401–410
 Chapter 42. Hearing (கேள்வி kēḷvi): 411–420
 Chapter 43. Knowledge Possession (அறிவுடைமை aṟivuṭaimai): 421–430
 Chapter 44. Error Correction (குற்றங்கடிதல் kuṟṟaṅkaṭital): 431–440
 Chapter 45. Seeking the Aid of Great Men (பெரியாரைத் துணைக்கோடல் periyārait tuṇaikkōṭal): 441–450
 Chapter 46. Avoiding Mean Associations (சிற்றினஞ்சேராமை ciṟṟiṉañcērāmai): 451–460
 Chapter 47. Acting after due Consideration (தெரிந்து செயல்வகை terintuceyalvakai): 461–470
 Chapter 48. The Knowledge of Power (வலியறிதல் valiyaṟital): 471–480
 Chapter 49. Knowledge of Apt Timing (காலமறிதல் kālamaṟital): 481–490
 Chapter 50. Knowledge of Location (இடனறிதல் iṭaṉaṟital): 491–500
 Chapter 51. Selection and Confidence (தெரிந்து தெளிதல் terintuteḷital): 501–510
 Chapter 52. Selection and Employment (தெரிந்து வினையாடல் terintuviṉaiyāṭal): 511–520
 Chapter 53. Cherishing One's Kindred (சுற்றந்தழால் cuṟṟantaḻāl): 521–530
 Chapter 54. Unforgetfulness (பொச்சாவாமை poccāvāmai): 531–540
 Chapter 55. The Right Sceptre (செங்கோன்மை ceṅkōṉmai): 541–550
 Chapter 56. The Cruel Sceptre (கொடுங்கோன்மை koṭuṅkōṉmai): 551–560
 Chapter 57. Absence of Terrorism (வெருவந்த செய்யாமை veruvantaceyyāmai): 561–570
 Chapter 58. Benignity (கண்ணோட்டம் kaṇṇōṭṭam): 571–580
 Chapter 59. Detectives (ஒற்றாடல் oṟṟāṭal): 581–590
 Chapter 60. Energetics (ஊக்கமுடைமை ūkkamuṭaimai): 591–600
 Chapter 61. Unsluggishness (மடியின்மை maṭiyiṉmai): 601–610
 Chapter 62. Manly Effort (ஆள்வினையுடைமை āḷviṉaiyuṭaimai): 611–620
 Chapter 63. Hopefulness in Trouble (இடுக்கண் அழியாமை iṭukkaṇ aḻiyāmai): 621–630
 Chapter 64. Ministry of State (அமைச்சு amaiccu): 631–640
 Chapter 65. Oratory (சொல்வன்மை colvaṉmai): 641–650
 Chapter 66. Purity in Execution (வினைத்தூய்மை viṉaittūymai): 651–660
 Chapter 67. Power in Execution (வினைத்திட்பம் viṉaittiṭpam): 661–670
 Chapter 68. The Method of Execution (வினை செயல்வகை viṉaiceyalvakai): 671–680
 Chapter 69. The Envoy (தூது tūtu): 681–690
 Chapter 70. Conduct in the Presence of the King (மன்னரைச் சேர்ந்தொழுதல் maṉṉaraic cērntoḻutal): 691–700
 Chapter 71. The Knowledge of Signals (குறிப்பறிதல் kuṟippaṟital): 701–710
 Chapter 72. The Knowledge of the Council Chamber (அவையறிதல் avaiyaṟital): 711–720
 Chapter 73. Dread avoidance (அவையஞ்சாமை avaiyañcāmai): 721–730
 Chapter 74. The Land (நாடு nāṭu): 731–740
 Chapter 75. The Fortification (அரண் araṇ): 741–750
 Chapter 76. Wealth Accumulation (பொருள் செயல்வகை poruḷceyalvakai): 751–760
 Chapter 77. The Excellence of an Army (படைமாட்சி paṭaimāṭci): 761–770
 Chapter 78. Military Spirit (படைச்செருக்கு paṭaiccerukku): 771–780
 Chapter 79. Friendship (நட்பு naṭpu): 781–790
 Chapter 80. Investigation in Forming Friendships (நட்பாராய்தல் naṭpārāytal): 791–800
 Chapter 81. Familiarity (பழைமை paḻaimai): 801–810
 Chapter 82. Evil Friendship (தீ நட்பு tī naṭpu): 811–820
 Chapter 83. Unreal Friendship (கூடா நட்பு kūṭānaṭpu): 821–830
 Chapter 84. Folly (பேதைமை pētaimai): 831–840
 Chapter 85. Ignorance (புல்லறிவாண்மை pullaṟivāṇmai): 841–850
 Chapter 86. Hostility (இகல் ikal): 851–860
 Chapter 87. The Might of Hatred (பகை மாட்சி pakaimāṭci): 861–870
 Chapter 88. Recognizing the Quality of Enmity (பகைத்திறந்தெரிதல் pakaittiṟanterital): 871–880
 Chapter 89. Internal Enmity (உட்பகை uṭpakai): 881–890
 Chapter 90. Not Offending the Great (பெரியாரைப் பிழையாமை periyāraip piḻaiyāmai): 891–900
 Chapter 91. Being led by Women (பெண்வழிச் சேறல் peṇvaḻiccēṟal): 901–910
 Chapter 92. Wanton Women (வரைவின் மகளிர் varaiviṉmakaḷir): 911–920
 Chapter 93. Abstinence from Liquor (கள்ளுண்ணாமை kaḷḷuṇṇāmai): 921–930
 Chapter 94. Gaming (Gambling) (சூது cūtu): 931–940
 Chapter 95. Medicine (மருந்து ): 941–950
 Chapter 96. Lineage (குடிமை kuṭimai): 951–960
 Chapter 97. Honour (மானம் māṉam): 961–970
 Chapter 98. Greatness (பெருமை perumai): 971–980
 Chapter 99. Perfectness (சான்றாண்மை cāṉṟāṇmai): 981–990
 Chapter 100. Courtesy (பண்புடைமை paṇpuṭaimai): 991–1000
 Chapter 101. Wealth without Benefaction (நன்றியில் செல்வம் naṉṟiyilcelvam): 1001–1010
 Chapter 102. Shame (நாணுடைமை nāṇuṭaimai): 1011–1020
 Chapter 103. Family Maintenance (குடிசெயல்வகை kuṭiceyalvakai): 1021–1030
 Chapter 104. Agriculture (உழவு uḻavu): 1031–1040
 Chapter 105. Poverty (நல்குரவு nalkuravu): 1041–1050
 Chapter 106. Mendicancy (இரவு iravu): 1051–1060
 Chapter 107. The Dread of Mendicancy (இரவச்சம் iravaccam): 1061–1070
 Chapter 108. Baseness (கயமை kayamai): 1071–1080

In the Book of Poruḷ, the Kural literature appears not only as a book of lofty wisdom, but also as a book of "shrewd cunning," according to Zvelebil, still keeping the moral very empirical and pragmatic as with the rest of the work. The book is less virtuous than the Book of Aram and more diplomatic since it deals with various people in the society. Morals are presented only incidentally and sporadically except in the appendix consisting of the final 13 chapters.

The initial chapters on royalty define the ideal sovereign, such as being well informed; keeping befitting company; not letting opportunities slide; using discretion in the choice of civil and military servants; holding a benign sceptre of gold firm yet popular, rather than of iron; and being ever active without any despair in affliction. The chapters on ministers of state deal with the qualifications of ministers, their conduct in the royal court, and their diplomacy. The chapters on the essentials of the state deal with the necessaries of a kingdom, handling international relationships, and virtuous tactics of warfare. There are also chapters that forbid evil conducts such as uxoriousness, harlotry, intoxication and gambling and a chapter on healthy living. The "appendix" chapters deal with both affirmative morality, such as honour, greatness, perfection, courtesy and self-reprobation, and negative morality, such as dread of poverty, mendicancy, dread of mendicancy and vileness.

Structural plan of the book
The Kural literature has a very distinct and a well-thought-out structural plan, giving the Kural couplets two different meaning, namely, a structural meaning (when read in relation to the whole) and a proverbial meaning (when read in isolation). This is more pronounced in the Book of Poruḷ, where the couplets, when read in relation to the whole, reveal that the Kural's ethics is entirely different from that of Chanakya or Machiavelli. The very order of the Book of Poruḷ within the Kural literature indicates that the public life of a person, which the Book of Poruḷ expounds, is discussed only after his or her inner, moral growth has been ensured by the Book of Aṟam preceding it. In short, the entire structural meaning of the Book of Poruḷ emphasizes that only a cultured, civilized man, who is morally and spiritually ripe, is fit to enter public or political life.

Comparison with other ancient texts
The statecraft dealt with in the Book of Poruḷ has semblance with several ancient texts in the pan-Indian expanse such as the Manusmriti, Kautilya's Arthashastra, and Kamandaka's Nitisara, to name a few. The codes of kingship, diplomacy, and citizenship found in the Book of Poruḷ share a common ground with these texts. However, the Book of Poruḷ remains unique in its attitudes and approaches. For example, as against the subtle statecraft found in Arthashastra, the ideas of governance and polity found in the Book of Poruḷ are based on a "moralistic and benevolent bedrock". By opposing Manusmriti's social order given in the form of a complex web of hierarchies and discriminations, the Book of Poruḷ suggests human brotherhood and oneness of humanity.

Comparison with the Arthashastra
Despite several scholars trying to draw parallels between the economic concepts of Kautilya found in Arthashastra and those found in the Book of Porul, there seems to be no resemblance between the two. While Valluvar gives primary importance to agriculture in the Book of Porul, this is not the case in Arthashastra. While Kautilya suggests various taxes to raise the revenue of a government, including by means of intimidation and persuasion, Valluvar does not entertain this. Rather, he believes in taxation by consent. Kautilya's economic system is primarily based on caste, which is virtually absent in Valluvar's thought. Valluvar's economic system, on the other hand, is based on ethical principles, which are not found in the Arthashastra. While Kautilya allows exploiting the gullibility and religious beliefs of the subject, and even drinking and prostitution, as means to enriching the state's coffers, Valluvar denounces these as sins. While Kautilya writes about arts and artists, Valluvar strangely doesn’t touch upon the subject of arts and performance arts anywhere in the Kural text.

Translations
The Book of Porul is the second most translated book of the Kural literature after the Book of Aram, and most of the translators of the Kural text have translated the Book of Porul. Some of the earliest translations include those by Father Beschi, Karl Graul, and E. S. Ariel. Beschi translated the book into Latin as "rerum proprietates". Graul translated it into Latin and German as "de bonis" and "vom Gute," respectively. Ariel translated it into French as "la fortune."

Influence
According to T. N. Hajela, Valluvar's thoughts on agriculture found in the Book of Poruḷ have influenced the Chola emperor Karikala of the 1st century CE to undertake massive developmental measures for land reclamation, colonisation, construction of dams, and other agrarian reforms.

See also

 Aram (Kural book)
 Inbam (Kural book)

Notes

a.  These various meanings of poruḷ come from couplets 63, 128, 141, 176, 178, 199, 371, 212, 247, 254, 307, 351, 423, 462, 583, 741, and 1046 of the Tirukkural.

b.  The idea that poruḷ means the "ultimate reality" comes from couplets 141 and 501 of the Tirukkural.

Citations

References

Primary sources (Tamil)

 Alathur Kilar, Kḻuvāi Illai!, புறநானூறு [Puranānuru] (Verse 34), See original text in Tamil Virtual University.
 
 Ilango Adigal, சிலப்பதிகாரம் [Silappathigāram], See original text in Tamil Virtual University.
 Kambar, கம்பராமாயணம் [Kambarāmāyanam], See original text in Tamil Virtual University.
 
 
 Seethalai Sāthanār, மணிமேகலை [Manimekalai], See original text in Tamil Virtual University.
 Sekkiḻar, பெரிய‌ புராண‌ம் [Periya Puranam], See original text in Tamil Virtual University.
  See original text in Project Madurai.

Secondary sources

Further reading

External links
Tirukkural: Work by Tiruvalluvar from Encyclopaedia Britannica

Tirukkural